Alena Mejzlíková-Kyselicová (born 14 November 1957 in Trenčianske Teplice) is a Slovak former field hockey player. She competed for Czechoslovakia in the 1980 Summer Olympics.

References

External links
 
 
 
 

1957 births
Living people
Slovak female field hockey players
Olympic field hockey players of Czechoslovakia
Field hockey players at the 1980 Summer Olympics
Olympic silver medalists for Czechoslovakia
Olympic medalists in field hockey
Medalists at the 1980 Summer Olympics
People from Trenčianske Teplice
Sportspeople from the Trenčín Region